The men's doubles competition of the bowling events at the 2015 Pan American Games was held on July 22 and 23  at Planet Bowl (Pan Am Bowling Centre), due to naming rights the venue was known as the latter for the duration of the games.

Canadian pair François Lavoie and Dan MacLelland went onto secure the gold medal, with Lavoie scoring a perfect game in the fifth round, the first in Pan American Games history.

Schedule

All times are Eastern Standard Time (UTC-3).

Qualification

A total of 14 countries qualified two bowlers each through various events. This is summarized below.

Medalists

Results

References

Bowling at the 2015 Pan American Games